The Order of Besa was established by Ahmet Zogu (later King Zog I) when he was President of Albania. Founded on 22 December 1926, it was initially awarded in four classes (1. Grand Cordon with star–Kordon i Madh me Yll, 2. Grand Officer–Oficer i Madh, 3. Commander–Komandar, and 4. Knight–Kalorës) and a medal. It was limited to six ordinary recipients of Albanian nationality, and not awardable to foreigners.

It was remodelled in 1932 and reduced to three classes: 
 Grand Cordon with star–Kordon i Madh me Yll
 Commander–Komandar 
 Knight–Kalorës. 

It remained limited to only six ordinary recipients of Albanian nationality, and not awardable to foreigners.

The order was retained under the Kingdom of Albania of King Vittorio Emanuele III until 1943, and by the House of Zogu as a dynastic order.

At its last remodelling, it had six classes: 
 Grand Cross, Special Class
 Grand Cross
 Grand Officer
 Commander
 Officer
 Knight/Dame

Notable recipients
 King Farouk of Egypt
 Prince Abib of Turkey
 Shah Mohammad Reza Pahlavi of Iran
 Anwar Sadat, President of Egypt
 Miklós Horthy, Regent of the Kingdom of Hungary

See also
 Orders, decorations and medals of Albania

External links
 Albanian Royal Decorations

References

Orders, decorations, and medals of Albania
Awards established in 1926
1926 establishments in Albania